Timothy A. Cross is an American academic chemist who specializes in nuclear magnetic resonance (NMR) spectroscopy, membrane and computational biophysics, and biomathematics.  He is a professor of chemistry at Florida State University and the Director of the NMR Program at the National High Magnetic Field Laboratory.  His research focuses on the sets of proteins that are important for the pharmaceutical industry in the treatment of diseases such as the flu (Influenza A) and tuberculosis.

External links
 National High Magnetic Field Laboratory faculty profile
 FSU Faculty profile on Timothy Cross' research

Florida State University faculty
21st-century American chemists
Living people
Computational chemists
Year of birth missing (living people)